The Balintawak Interchange , also known as the Balintawak Cloverleaf, is a two-level cloverleaf interchange in Quezon City, Metro Manila, the Philippines which serves as the junction between Epifanio de los Santos Avenue (EDSA) and the North Luzon Expressway (NLEx).  Opened in 1968 as part of the initial  NLEx segment between Quezon City and Guiguinto, Bulacan, it was one of the first projects of the Construction and Development Corporation of the Philippines, now the Philippine National Construction Corporation (PNCC).

Construction of the interchange was precipitated by the large number of motor vehicles in Manila and the surrounding suburbs in the 1960s, which contributed to significant traffic congestion. On June 25, 1966, President Ferdinand Marcos ordered the Department of Public Works to undertake the construction of a number of road projects to be financed through World War II reparations, including the construction of interchanges on vital intersections along EDSA. This order would later lead to the construction of this interchange, replacing a previous roundabout between EDSA, A. Bonifacio Avenue, and Quirino Highway, and the Magallanes Interchange between EDSA and the South Luzon Expressway (SLEX), which opened in 1975. A shrine to Andres Bonifacio would later be constructed inside the interchange, which underwent a  renovation in 2009.

Flooding in the area around the Balintawak Interchange is a problem, with the interchange being named in 2014 as one of the twenty-two most flood-prone roadways in Metro Manila. In addition to flooding, the interchange has been criticized by columnist Cito Beltran of The Philippine Star for being rife with corrupt policemen and petty crime.

Apart from the wet markets and drop-off points of goods from the north, Ayala Malls Cloverleaf and the entire Cloverleaf complex is located southeast of the interchange. An LRT-1 station serves the location east of the interchange.

References

Road interchanges in the Philippines